The 2004 NASCAR Craftsman Truck Series was the tenth season of the Craftsman Truck Series, the third highest stock car racing series sanctioned by NASCAR in the United States. Bobby Hamilton of Bobby Hamilton Racing won the championship.

2004 teams and drivers

Full-time teams

Part-time teams
Note: If under "team", the owner's name is listed and in italics, that means the name of the race team that fielded the truck is unknown.

Notes

Races

Florida Dodge Dealers 250

The Florida Dodge Dealers 250 was held February 13 at Daytona International Speedway. Terry Cook won the pole.

Top ten results

99-Carl Edwards
24-Travis Kvapil
52-Mike Wallace
14-Rick Crawford
10-Terry Cook
46-Dennis Setzer
50-Jon Wood
29-Frank Kimmel
17-David Reutimann
03-Geoff Bodine

Failed to qualify: Kelly Sutton (#02), Phil Bonifield (#25), L. W. Miller (#28), Greg Sacks (#48), Loni Richardson (#0)

Easycare Vehicle Contracts 200

The inaugural EasyCare Vehicle Service Contracts 200 was held March 13 at Atlanta Motor Speedway. David Reutimann won the pole. Toyota's First Pole in the Truck series. This race suffered a scary crash on lap 45, involving Rick Crawford, Tina Gordon, and Hank Parker Jr.

Top ten results

4-Bobby Hamilton
42-Mike Skinner
17-David Reutimann
24-Travis Kvapil
88-Matt Crafton
15-Shane Hmiel
99-Carl Edwards
1-Ted Musgrave
18-Chad Chaffin
52-Ken Schrader

Failed to qualify: Greg Sacks (#48), L. W. Miller (#28), Loni Richardson (#0)

Kroger 250

The Kroger 250 was held April 17 at Martinsville Speedway. Jack Sprague won the pole. This race marked the NASCAR debut for future Cup Series champion Brad Keselowski.

Top ten results

14-Rick Crawford
46-Dennis Setzer
16-Jack Sprague
50-Jon Wood
42-Mike Skinner
99-Carl Edwards
6-Matt Crafton
17-David Reutimann
75-David Starr
18-Chad Chaffin

Failed to qualify: Geoff Bodine (#03), Chris Wimmer (#63), Johnny Sauter (#43), David Froelich Jr. (#57), Kelly Sutton (#02), Wayne Edwards (#48), Richard Hampton (#19), Ricky Gonzalez (#93), Craig Wood (#73)

UAW/GM Ohio 250

For the first time in 50 years a NASCAR race was held in Ohio. The UAW/GM Ohio 250 was held May 16 at Mansfield Motorsports Speedway. Jack Sprague was awarded the pole after rain washed out qualifying.

Top ten results

16-Jack Sprague
46-Dennis Setzer
10-Terry Cook
4-Bobby Hamilton
88-Tracy Hines
59-Mark McFarland
14-Rick Crawford
50-Jon Wood
75-David Starr
6-Matt Crafton

Failed to qualify: Kevin Love (#67), Robert Huffman (#12), David Froelich Jr. (#57), Richard Hampton (#19), Craig Wood (#73), J. C. Stout (#91), Sean Murphy (#30), David Ragan (#66), Chris Winter (#05), Randy van Zant (#83), Jim Walker (#74)

Infineon 200

The Infineon 200 was held May 21 at Lowe's Motor Speedway. David Starr won the pole.

Top ten results

46-Dennis Setzer
99-Carl Edwards
75-David Starr
92-Kevin Harvick
47-Michael Waltrip
15-Shane Hmiel
14-Rick Crawford
24-Travis Kvapil
6-Matt Crafton
4-Bobby Hamilton

Failed to qualify: Kelly Sutton (#02), Derrike Cope (#48)

MBNA America 200

The MBNA America 200 was held June 4 at Dover International Speedway. Carl Edwards won the pole.

Top ten results

18-Chad Chaffin*
14-Rick Crawford
21-Hank Parker Jr.
42-Mike Skinner
52-Ken Schrader
23-Dave Blaney
2-Andy Houston
75-David Starr
16-Jack Sprague
50-Jon Wood

Chaffin's first career win.

Failed to qualify: none

O'Reilly 400K

The O'Reilly 400K was held June 11 at Texas Motor Speedway. Ted Musgrave won the pole.

Top ten results

46-Dennis Setzer
1-Ted Musgrave
17-David Reutimann
16-Jack Sprague
18-Chad Chaffin
99-Carl Edwards
4-Bobby Hamilton
6-Matt Crafton
2-Andy Houston
62-Steve Park

Failed to qualify: none

O'Reilly 200

The O'Reilly 200 was held June 19 at Memphis Motorsports Park. Jack Sprague won the pole.

Top ten results

4-Bobby Hamilton
15-Shane Hmiel
1-Ted Musgrave
46-Dennis Setzer
99-Carl Edwards
6-Matt Crafton
16-Jack Sprague
50-Jon Wood
18-Chad Chaffin
75-David Starr

Failed to qualify: Darren Shaw (#04), Jarod Robie (#98), Paul White (#77), Scotty Sands (#97), Dennis Hannel (#94)

Black Cat Fireworks 200

The Black Cat Fireworks 200 was held June 25 at The Milwaukee Mile. Ted Musgrave won the pole.

Top ten results

1-Ted Musgrave
18-Chad Chaffin
46-Dennis Setzer
62-Steve Park
24-Travis Kvapil
4-Bobby Hamilton
10-Terry Cook
07-Shane Sieg
14-Rick Crawford
6-Matt Crafton

Failed to qualify: none

O'Reilly Auto Parts 250

The O'Reilly Auto Parts 250 was held July 3 at Kansas Speedway. Dennis Setzer won the pole.

Top ten results

99-Carl Edwards
4-Bobby Hamilton
14-Rick Crawford
62-Steve Park
6-Matt Crafton
50-Jon Wood
24-Travis Kvapil
16-Jack Sprague
18-Chad Chaffin
10-Terry Cook

Failed to qualify: none

Built Ford Tough 225

The Built Ford Tough 225 was held July 10 at Kentucky Speedway. Dennis Setzer won the pole.

Top ten results

4-Bobby Hamilton
16-Jack Sprague
75-David Starr
6-Matt Crafton
18-Chad Chaffin
62-Steve Park
1-Ted Musgrave
2-Andy Houston
17-David Reutimann
12-Robert Huffman

Failed to qualify: none

Missouri-Illinois Dodge Dealers Ram Tough 200

The Missouri-Illinois Dodge Dealers Ram Tough 200 was held July 17 at Gateway International Raceway. Jack Sprague won the pole. This race would be the final to feature unlimited Green-White-Checkered finishing attempts until 2017, as this race took four attempts to finish under green.

Top ten results

75-David Starr
46-Dennis Setzer
1-Ted Musgrave
18-Chad Chaffin
21-Hank Parker Jr.
6-Matt Crafton
24-Travis Kvapil
59-Randy LaJoie
17-David Reutimann
22-Bill Lester

Failed to qualify: none

Line-X Spray-On Truck Bedliners 200

The Line-X Spray-On Truck Bedliners 200 was held July 31 at Michigan International Speedway. Dennis Setzer won the pole.

Top ten results

24-Travis Kvapil
1-Ted Musgrave
42-Mike Skinner
23-Johnny Benson
4-Bobby Hamilton
99-Carl Edwards
10-Terry Cook
15-Shane Hmiel
12-Robert Huffman
46-Dennis Setzer

Failed to qualify: none

This race marked the first NASCAR victory for Toyota.

Power Stroke Diesel 200

The Power Stroke Diesel 200 was held August 6 at Indianapolis Raceway Park. Jack Sprague won the pole. This race marked the NASCAR debut for Denny Hamlin.

Top ten results

18-Chad Chaffin
43-Johnny Sauter
4-Bobby Hamilton
24-Travis Kvapil
99-Carl Edwards
15-Shane Hmiel
6-Matt Crafton
14-Rick Crawford
88-Tracy Hines
03-Denny Hamlin

Failed to qualify: Chris Wimmer (#63), Tim Schendel (#31), Kelly Sutton (#02), Ken Weaver (#08), Charlie Bradberry (#78), Buddy Davis (#28), Sean Murphy (#30), Greg Pope (#89), Nick Tucker (#48), Eric McClure (#27), Scotty Sands (#97), Jim Walker (#74), Patrick Lawson (#26), Dennis Hannel (#0), Casey Kingsland (#55)

Toyota Tundra 200

The Toyota Tundra 200 was held August 14 at Nashville Superspeedway. Local product Bobby Hamilton Jr. won the pole, and his father, Bobby Hamilton, won the race. Both Hamiltons considered Nashville their home track.

Top ten results

4-Bobby Hamilton
75-David Starr
1-Ted Musgrave
04-Bobby Hamilton Jr.
62-Steve Park
23-Johnny Benson
6-Matt Crafton
12-Robert Huffman
17-David Reutimann
42-Mike Skinner

Failed to qualify: James Hylton (#77)

O'Reilly 200 presented by Valvoline Maxlife

The O'Reilly 200 presented by Valvoline Maxlife was held August 25 at Bristol Motor Speedway. Ken Schrader won the pole.

Top ten results

99-Carl Edwards
15-Shane Hmiel
6-Matt Crafton
47-Robby Gordon
92-Kevin Harvick
21-Hank Parker Jr.
75-David Starr
24-Travis Kvapil
62-Steve Park
52-Ken Schrader

Failed to qualify: Kelly Sutton (#02), Eric McClure (#72), Darren Shaw (#04), Ryan McGlynn (#00), Loni Richardson (#0), Nick Tucker (#48), Chris Winter (#05), Craig Wood (#73)

Kroger 200

The Kroger 200 was held September 9 at Richmond International Raceway. Jamie McMurray won the pole.

Top ten results

1-Ted Musgrave
2-Jamie McMurray
47-Tony Stewart
30-Todd Bodine
99-Carl Edwards
12-Robert Huffman
15-Shane Hmiel
16-Jack Sprague
10-Terry Cook
42-Mike Skinner

Failed to qualify: Jay Sauter (#06), Lance Hooper (#13), Tony Raines (#40), Mark McFarland (#59), Kelly Sutton (#02), Wayne Edwards (#93), Kyle Beattie (#0), Craig Wood (#73), J. C. Stout (#91), James Hylton (#48)

Sylvania 200

The Sylvania 200 was held September 18 at New Hampshire International Speedway. Jack Sprague won the pole. Despite starting several hours later than scheduled due to rain from Hurricane Ivan and with the threat of darkness, all 200 laps were completed. The race ended under caution at the scheduled distance after it was deemed too dark to have an attempt at a Green-White-Checkered finish due to a crash with less than 3 to go.

Top ten results

24-Travis Kvapil
16-Jack Sprague
23-Johnny Benson
99-Carl Edwards
17-David Reutimann
46-Dennis Setzer
1-Ted Musgrave
75-David Starr
21-Hank Parker Jr.
42-Mike Skinner*

Failed to qualify: Travis Powell (#95)

Last race for Skinner driving for Bang Racing.

Las Vegas 350

The Las Vegas 350 was held September 25 at Las Vegas Motor Speedway. Mike Skinner won the pole.

Top ten results

15-Shane Hmiel**
30-Todd Bodine
62-Steve Park
23-Johnny Benson
4-Bobby Hamilton
5-Mike Skinner*
46-Dennis Setzer
1-Ted Musgrave
10-Terry Cook
75-David Starr

Failed to qualify: Chris Wimmer (#63), Loni Richardson (#0)

This was Mike Skinner's first start driving for Bill Davis.
Shane's first career win.

American Racing Wheels 200

The American Racing Wheels 200 was held October 2 at California Speedway. Travis Kvapil won the pole.

Top ten results

30-Todd Bodine*
1-Ted Musgrave
16-Jack Sprague
75-David Starr
4-Bobby Hamilton
17-David Reutimann
23-Johnny Benson
62-Steve Park
46-Dennis Setzer
99-Carl Edwards

Failed to qualify: none

Bodine's first career win.

Silverado 350K

The Silverado 350K was held October 16 at Texas Motor Speedway. Mike Skinner won the pole.

Top ten results

30-Todd Bodine
23-Johnny Benson
4-Bobby Hamilton
75-David Starr
16-Jack Sprague
1-Ted Musgrave
14-Rick Crawford
46-Dennis Setzer
99-Carl Edwards
15-Shane Hmiel

Failed to qualify: Jay Sauter (#06), Wayne Edwards (#77), Loni Richardson (#0), Blake Mallory (#35)

Kroger 200

The Kroger 200 was held October 23 at Martinsville Speedway. Bobby Hamilton won the pole.

Top ten results

2-Jamie McMurray*
46-Dennis Setzer
47-Bobby Labonte
50-Jon Wood
1-Ted Musgrave
6-Matt Crafton
30-Todd Bodine
99-Carl Edwards
4-Bobby Hamilton Jr.
12-Robert Huffman

Failed to qualify: Robbie Ferguson (#93), Tony Raines (#40), Davin Scites (#20), Darrell Waltrip (#11), Jim Walker (#74), Eric King (#00), Tam Topham (#70), Craig Wood (#73), Jimmy Mullins (#77)

McMurray's First career win.

Chevy Silverado 150

The Chevy Silverado 150 was held November 5 at Phoenix International Raceway. Jack Sprague won the pole.

Top ten results

75-David Starr
16-Jack Sprague
6-Matt Crafton
15-Shane Hmiel
23-Johnny Benson
62-Steve Park
4-Bobby Hamilton
2-P. J. Jones
46-Dennis Setzer
99-Carl Edwards

Failed to qualify: Brad Teague (#72), Danny Bagwell (#41)

Darlington 200

The Darlington 200 was held November 13 at Darlington Raceway after rain washed out the race November 12.  The race was moved to Saturday as part of a day-night doubleheader on the Southern 500 weekend. Carl Edwards won the pole.

Top ten results

2-Kasey Kahne*
4-Bobby Hamilton
1-Ted Musgrave
99-Carl Edwards
62-Steve Park
23-Johnny Benson
75-David Starr
88-Matt Crafton
12-Robert Huffman
52-Ken Schrader

Failed to qualify: Danny Bagwell (#41)

This was Kahne's first Truck series victory in his first start.

Ford 200

The Ford 200 was held November 19 at Homestead-Miami Speedway. David Reutimann won the pole.

Top ten results

2-Kasey Kahne
1-Ted Musgrave
75-David Starr
17-David Reutimann
6-Matt Crafton
5-Mike Skinner
16-Jack Sprague
44-Greg Biffle
06-Regan Smith
46-Dennis Setzer

Failed to qualify: Sammy Sanders (#04), Brad Keselowski (#63), Shigeaki Hattori (#01), Derrike Cope (#48), Todd Bodine (#30), Jeff Jefferson (#03), Eric Jones (#74), Scott Lynch (#59), Ken Weaver (#08), Danny Bagwell (#41)

Full Drivers' Championship

(key) Bold – Pole position awarded by time. Italics – Pole position set by owner's points. * – Most laps led.

Rookie of the Year 
34-year-old David Reutimann, driving for the start-up Darrell Waltrip Motorsports, clinched the 2004 Rookie of the Year title, posting four top-fives and winning two poles. Runner-up Tracy Hines had two top-tens for ThorSport Racing, while neither Brandon Whitt nor Chase Montgomery had a top-ten. Shane Sieg, Kelly Sutton, Ken Weaver, Chris Wimmer and Brad Keselowski had only part-time runs, while Shelby Howard was released from his ride early in the season.

See also 
 2004 NASCAR Nextel Cup Series
 2004 NASCAR Busch Series

References

External links 
Truck Series Standings and Statistics for 2004

NASCAR Truck Series seasons